The following is a list of heads of the federal subjects of the Russian Federation. The Republic of Crimea and the city of Sevastopol, along with the Donetsk People's Republic, Kherson Oblast, the Lugansk People's Republic and Zaporozhye Oblast were annexed by Russia between 2014 and 2022 and, according to its constitution, are Federal subjects. However, internationally these entities are recognized as part of Ukraine.

Current

Former
This is a complete list of the former heads of the federal subjects of Russia.

Republic of Adygea: Aslan Tkhakushinov (2007–2017), Khazret Sovmen (2002–2007), Aslan Dzharimov (1992–2002)
Altai Republic: Alexander Berdnikov (2006–2019), Mikhail Lapshin (2002–2006), Semyon Zubakin (1998–2002), Vladilen Volkov (1997-1998), Valery Chaptynov (1994–1997)
Republic of Bashkortostan: Rustem Khamitov (2010–2018), Murtaza Rakhimov (1993–2010)
Republic of Buryatia: Vyacheslav Nagovitsyn (2007–2017), Leonid Potapov (1994–2007)
Chechen Republic: Alu Alkhanov (2004–2007), Sergey Abramov (2004, acting), Akhmad Kadyrov (2003–2004), Anatoly Popov (2003, acting), Akhmad Kadyrov (2000–2003), Yakub Deniyev (1999–2000, acting), Doku Zagayev (1995–1996), Umar Avturkhanov (1993–1995)
Chuvash Republic: Mikhail Ignatyev (2010-2020), Nikolay Fyodorov (1994–2010)
Republic of Dagestan: Vladimir Vasilyev (2017–2020), Ramazan Abdulatipov (2013–2017), Magomedsalam Magomedov (2010–2013), Mukhu Aliyev (2006–2010), Magomedali Magomedov (1994–2006)
Republic of Ingushetia: Yunus-bek Yevkurov (2009–2019), Rashid Gaisanov (2009, acting), Yunus-bek Yevkurov (2008–2009), Murat Zyazikov (2002–2008), Akhmed Malsagov (2001–2002, acting), Ruslan Aushev (1993–2001)
Kabardino-Balkar Republic: Yury Kokov (2013–2018), Arsen Kanokov (2005–2013), Valery Kokov (1992–2005)
Republic of Kalmykia: Aleksey Orlov (2010–2019), Kirsan Ilyumzhinov (1993–2010)
Karachay–Cherkess Republic: Boris Ebzeyev (2008–2011), Mustafa Batdyyev (2003–2008), Vladimir Semyonov (1999–2003), Valentin Vlasov (1999, acting), Igor Ivanov (1999, acting), Vladimir Khubiyev (1992–1999)
Republic of Karelia: Aleksandr Hudilainen (2012–2017), Andrey Nelidov (2010–2012), Sergey Katanandov (1998–2010), Viktor Stepanov (1994–1998)
Republic of Khakassia: Mikhail Razvozhayev (2018, acting), Viktor Zimin (2009–2018), Aleksey Lebed (1997–2009), Yevgeny Smirnov (1992–1997)
Komi Republic: Sergey Gaplikov (2015–2020), Vyacheslav Gayzer (2010–2015), Vladimir Torlopov (2002–2010), Yury Spiridonov (1992–2002)
Mari El Republic: Alexander Yevstifeyev (2017–2022), Leonid Markelov (2000–2017), Vyacheslav Kislitsyn (1997–2001), Vladislav Zotin (1991–1996)
Republic of Mordovia: Vladimir Volkov (2012–2020), Nikolay Merkushkin (1995–2012), Vasily Guslyannikov (1991–1993)
Republic of North Ossetia–Alania: Vyacheslav Bitarov (2016–2021), Tamerlan Aguzarov (2015–2016), Taymuraz Mamsurov (2005–2015), Alexander Dzasokhov (1998–2005), Akhsarbek Galazov (1994–1998)
Sakha Republic: Yegor Borisov (2010–2018), Vyacheslav Shtyrov (2002–2010), Mikhail Nikolayev (1991–2002)
Republic of Tatarstan: Mintimer Shaymiyev (1991–2010)
Tyva Republic: Sholban Kara-ool (2007–2021), Sherig-ool Oorzhak (1992–2007)
Udmurt Republic: Alexander Solovyov (2014–2017), Alexander Volkov (2000–2014)
Altai Krai: Alexander Karlin (2005–2018), Mikhail Kozlov (2005, acting), Mikhail Evdokimov (2004–2005), Aleksandr Surikov (1996–2004), Lev Korshunov (1994–1996), Vladimir Rayfikesht (1991–1994)
Kamchatka Krai: Vladimir Ilyukhin (2011-2020), Aleksey Kuzmitsky (2007–2011)
Kamchatka Oblast: Aleksey Kuzmitsky (2007, acting),  Mikhail Mashkovtsev (2000–2007), Vladimir Biryukov (1991–2000)
Koryak Autonomous Okrug: Oleg Kozhemyako (2005–2007), Vladimir Loginov (2000–2005), Valentina Bronevich (1996—2000), Sergey Leushkin (1991–1996)
Khabarovsk Krai: Sergei Furgal (2018–2020), Vyacheslav Shport (2009–2018), Viktor Ishayev (1991–2009)
Krasnodar Krai: Aleksandr Tkachyov (2001–2015), Nikolay Kondratenko (1997–2001), Nikolay Yegorov (1996–1997), Yevgeny Kharitonov (1994–1996), Nikolay Yegorov (1992–1994), Vasily Dyakonov (1991–1992)
Krasnoyarsk Krai: Viktor Tolokonsky (2014–2017), Lev Kuznetsov (2010–2014), Edkham Akbulatov (2010, acting), Alexander Khloponin (2002–2010), Nikolay Ashlapov (2002, acting), Alexander Lebed (1998–2002), Valery Zubov (1993–1998), Arkady Veprev (1991–1993)
Evenk Autonomous Okrug: Boris Zolotaryov (2001-2006), Aleksandr Bokovikov, (1997-2001), Anatoly Yakimov (1991-1997)
Taymyr Autonomous Okrug: Oleg Budargin (2003-2006), Alexander Khloponin (2001–2002), Gennady Nedelin (1991-2001)
Perm Krai:Maxim Reshetnikov (2017–2020), Viktor Basargin (2012–2017), Oleg Chirkunov (2005–2012)
Komi-Permyak Autonomous Okrug: Gennady Savelyev (2000–2005), Nikolay Poluyanov (1991–2000)
Perm Oblast: Oleg Chirkunov (2004–2005, acting); Yury Trutnev (2000–2004); Gennady Igumnov (1996–2000), Boris Kuznetsov (1991–1996)
Primorsky Krai: Andrey Tarasenko (2017–2018, acting), Vladimir Miklushevsky (2012–2017), Sergey Darkin (2001–2012), Konstantin Tolstoshein (2001, acting), Igor Belchuk (2001, acting), Valentin Dubinin (2001, acting), Yevgeny Nazdratenko (1993–2001), Vladimir Kuznetsov (1991–1993)
Stavropol Krai: Valery Zerenkov (2012–2013), Valery Gayevsky (2008–2012), Alexander Chernogorov (1996–2008); Pyotr Marchenko (1995–1996); Yevgeny Kuznetsov (1991–1995)
Zabaykalsky Krai: Aleksandr Kulakov (2018, acting), Natalia Zhdanova (2016–2018), Konstantin Ilkovsky (2013–2016), Ravil Geniatulin (2008–2013) 
Agin-Buryat Autonomous Okrug: Bair Zhamsuyev (1997–2008), Bolot Ayushiyev (1996-1997), Gurodarma Tsedashiyev (1991–1996)
Chita Oblast: Ravil Geniatulin (1996–2008), Boris Ivanov (1991–1996)
Amur Oblast: Alexander Kozlov (2015–2018), Oleg Kozhemyako (2008–2015), Nikolay Kolesov (2007–2008), Aleksandr Nesterenko (2007, acting), Leonid Korotkov (2001–2007), Anatoly Belonogov (1997–2001), Yury Lyashko (1996–1997), Vladimir Dyachenko (1994–1996), Vladimir Polevanov (1993–1994), Aleksandr Surat (1993), Albert Krivchenko (1991–1993)
Arkhangelsk Oblast: Igor Orlov (2012-2020), Ilya Mikhalchuk (2008–2012), Nikolay Kiselyov (2004–2008), Anatoly Yefremov (1996–2004), Valentin Vlasov (1996, acting), Pavel Balakshin (1991–1996)
Astrakhan Oblast: Sergey Morozov (2018-2019, acting), Alexander Zhilkin (2004–2018), Anatoly Guzhvin (1991–2004)
Belgorod Oblast: Denis Butsayev (2020, acting), Yevgeny Savchenko (1993–2020), Viktor Berestovoy (1991–1993)
Bryansk Oblast: Nikolay Denin (2004–2014), Yury Lodkin (1996–2004), Aleksandr Semernyov (1996), Vladimir Barabanov (1995–1996), Vladimir Karpov (1993–1995), Yury Lodkin (1993), Vladimir Barabanov (1991–1993)
Chelyabinsk Oblast: Boris Dubrovsky (2014–2019), Mikhail Yurevich (2010–2014), Pyotr Sumin (1996–2010), Vadim Solovyov (1991–1996)
Irkutsk Oblast: Sergey Levchenko (2015–2019), Sergey Yeroshchenko (2012–2015), Dmitry Mezentsev (2009–2012), Sergey Sokol (2009, acting), Igor Yesipovsky (2008–2009), Aleksandr Tishanin (2005–2008), Boris Govorin (1997–2005), Vitaly Ivanov (1997, acting), Yury Nozhikov (1991–1997)
 Ust-Orda Buryat Autonomous Okrug: Valery Maleyev (1996–2007), Aleksey Batagayev (1991–1996)
Ivanovo Oblast: Pavel Konkov (2013–2017), Mikhail Men (2005–2013), Vladimir Tikhonov (2000–2005), Vladislav Tikhomirov (1996–2000), Adolf Laptev (1991–1996)
Kaliningrad Oblast: Yevgeny Zinichev (2016, acting), Nikolay Tsukanov (2010–2016), Georgy Boos (2005–2010), Vladimir Yegorov (2000–2005), Leonid Gorbenko (1996–2000), Yuri Matochkin (1991–1996)
Kaluga Oblast: Anatoly Artamonov (2000–2020), Valery Sudarenkov (1996–2000), Oleg Savchenko (1996), Aleksandr Deryagin (1991–1996)
Kemerovo Oblast: Aman Tuleyev (2001–2018), Valentin Mazikin (2001, acting), Aman Tuleyev (1997–2001), Mikhail Kislyuk (1991–1997)
Kirov Oblast: Igor Vasilyev (2016–2022), Aleksey Kuznetsov (2016, acting),  Nikita Belykh (2009–2016), Nikolay Shaklein (2004–2009), Vladimir Sergeyenkov (1996–2004), Vasily Desyatnikov (1991–1996)
Kostroma Oblast: Igor Slyunyayev (2007–2012), Viktor Shershunov (1996–2007), Valery Arbuzov (1991–1996)
Kurgan Oblast: Aleksey Kokorin (2014–2018), Oleg Bogomolov (1997–2014), Anatoly Sobolev (1995–1997), Valentin Gerasimov (1991–1995)
Kursk Oblast: Alexander Mikhaylov (2000–2018), Aleksandr Rutskoy (1996–2000), Vasily Shuteyev (1991–1996)
Leningrad Oblast: Valery Serdyukov (1998–2012), Vadim Gustov (1996–1998), Alexander Belyakov (1991–1996)
Lipetsk Oblast: Oleg Korolyov (1998–2018), Mikhail Narolin (1993–1998), Vladimir Zaytsev (1992–1993, acting) Gennady Kuptsov (1991–1992)
Magadan Oblast: Vladimir Pechyony (2013-2018); Nikolay Dudov (2003–2013), Valentin Tsvetkov (1996–2002), Viktor Mikhailov (1991–1996)
Moscow Oblast: Ruslan Tsalikov (2012, acting), Sergey Shoygu (2012), Boris Gromov (2000–2012), Vasily Golubev (1999–2000, acting), Anatoly Tyazhlov (1991–1999)
Murmansk Oblast: Marina Kovtun (2012–2019), Dmitry Dmitriyenko (2009–2012), Yury Yevdokimov (1996–2009), Yevgeny Komarov (1991–1996)
Nizhny Novgorod Oblast: Valery Shantsev (2005–2017), Gennady Khodyrev (2001–2005), Ivan Sklyarov (1997–2001), Yury Lebedev (1997, acting), Boris Nemtsov (1991–1997)
Novgorod Oblast: Sergey Mitin (2007–2017), Mikhail Prusak (1991–2007)
Novosibirsk Oblast: Vladimir Gorodetsky (2014–2017), Vasily Yurchenko (2010–2014), Viktor Tolokonsky (2000–2010), Vitaly Mukha (1995–2000), Ivan Indinok (1993–1995), Vitaly Mukha (1991–1993)
Omsk Oblast: Viktor Nazarov (2012–2017), Leonid Polezhayev (1991–2012)
Orenburg Oblast: Yury Berg (2010–2019), Alexey Chernyshov (1999–2010), Vladimir Yelagin (1991–1999)
Oryol Oblast: Vadim Potomsky (2014–2017), Aleksandr Kozlov (2009–2014), Yegor Stroyev (1993–2009), Nikolay Yudin (1991–1993)
Penza Oblast: Ivan Belozertsev (2015–2021), Vasily Bochkaryov (1998–2015), Anatoly Kovlyagin (1993–1998), Aleksandr Kondratyev (1991–1993)
Pskov Oblast: Andrey Turchak (2009–2017), Mikhail Kuznetsov (2004–2009), Yevgeny Mikhailov (1996–2004), Vladislav Tumanov (1992–1996), Anatoly Dobryakov (1991-1992)
Rostov Oblast: Vladimir Chub (1991–2010)
Ryazan Oblast: Nikolay Lyubimov (2017–2022), Oleg Kovalyov (2008–2017), Georgy Shpak (2004–2008), Vyacheslav Lyubimov (1997–2004), Igor Ivlev (1996–1997), Gennady Merkulov (1994–1996), Lev Bashmakov (1991–1994)
Sakhalin Oblast: Vera Shcherbina (2018, acting), Oleg Kozhemyako (2015–2018), Alexander Khoroshavin (2007–2015), Ivan Malakhov (2003–2007), Igor Farkhutdinov (1995–2003), Yevgeny Krasnoyarov (1993–1995), Valentin Fyodorov (1991–1993)
Samara Oblast: Nikolay Merkushkin (2012–2017), Vladimir Artyakov (2007–2012), Konstantin Titov (1991–2007)
Saratov Oblast: Valery Radayev (2012–2022), Pavel Ipatov (2005–2012), Dmitry Ayatskov (1996–2005), Yury Belykh (1992–1996)
Smolensk Oblast: Sergey Antufyev (2007–2012), Viktor Maslov (2002–2007), Aleksandr Prokhorov (1998–2002), Anatoly Glushenkov (1993–1998), Valery Fateyev (1991–1993)
Sverdlovsk Oblast: Alexander Misharin (2009–2012), Eduard Rossel (1995–2009), Aleksey Strakhov (1994–1995), Valery Trushnikov (1993–1994, acting), Eduard Rossel (1991–1993)
Tambov Oblast: Alexander Nikitin (2015–2021), Oleg Betin (1999–2015), Aleksandr Ryabov (1995–1999), Oleg Betin (1995), Vladimir Babenko (1991–1995)
Tomsk Oblast: Sergey Zhvachkin (2012–2022), Viktor Kress (1991–2012)
Tula Oblast: Vladimir Gruzdev (2011–2016), Vyacheslav Dudka (2005–2011), Vasiliy Starodubtsev (1997–2005), Nikolai Sevryugin (1991–1997)
Tver Oblast: Andrey Shevelyov (2011–2016), Dmitry Zelenin (2003–2011), Vladimir Platov (1995–2003), Vladimir Suslov (1991–1995)
Tyumen Oblast: Sergey Sarychev (2018, acting), Vladimir Yakushev (2005–2018), Sergey Smetanyuk (2005, acting), Sergey Sobyanin (2001–2005), Leonid Roketsky (1993–2001), Yury Shafranik (1991–1993)
Ulyanovsk Oblast: Sergei Morozov (2005–2021), Maria Bolshakova (2004–2005, acting), Vladimir Shamanov (2001–2004), Yury Goryachev (1992–2001)
Vladimir Oblast: Vladimir Sipyagin (2018–2021), Svetlana Orlova (2013–2018), Nikolay Vinogradov (1996–2013), Yury Vlasov (1991–1996)
Volgograd Oblast: Sergey Bozhenov (2012–2014), Anatoly Brovko (2010–2012), Nikolay Maksyuta (1997–2010), Ivan Shabunin (1991–1997)
Vologda Oblast: Vyacheslav Pozgalyov (1996–2011), Nikolay Podgornov (1991–1996)
Voronezh Oblast: Alexey Gordeyev (2009–2017), Vladimir Kulakov (2000–2009), Ivan Shabanov (1996–2000), Aleksandr Tsapin (1996), Aleksandr Kovalyov (1992–1996), Viktor Kalasnikov (1991–1992)
Yaroslavl Oblast: Dmitry Mironov (2017–2021), Sergey Yastrebov (2012–2017), Sergey Vakhrukov (2007–2012), Anatoly Lisitsyn (1991–2007)
Moscow: Vladimir Resin (2010, acting), Yury Luzhkov (1992–2010), Gavriil Popov (1991–1992)
Saint Petersburg: Georgy Poltavchenko (2011–2018), Valentina Matviyenko (2003–2011), Alexander Beglov (acting, 2003), Vladimir Yakovlev (1996–2003), Anatoly Sobchak (1991–1996)
Sevastopol: Dmitry Ovsyannikov (2016–2019), Sergey Menyaylo (2014–2016), Aleksei Chaly (2014, acting)
Jewish Autonomous Oblast: Alexander Levintal (2015–2019), Alexander Vinnikov (2010–2015), Nikolay Volkov (1991–2010)
Chukotka Autonomous Okrug: Roman Kopin (2008–2023), Roman Abramovich (2001–2008), Aleksandr Nazarov (1991–2000)
Khanty–Mansi Autonomous Okrug: Alexander Filipenko (1991–2010)
Nenets Autonomous Okrug: Alexander Tsybulsky (2017–2020), Igor Koshin (2014–2017), Igor Fyodorov (2009–2014), Valery Potapenko (2006–2009), Alexey Barinov (2005–2006), Vladimir Butov (1996–2005), Vladimir Khabarov (1996), Yury Komarovsky (1991–1996)
Yamalo-Nenets Autonomous Okrug: Dmitry Kobylkin (2010–2018), Yury Neyolov (1994–2010), Lev Bayandin (1991–1994)

Ethnicity of heads of Republics of Russia 

Ethnicity of heads of Republics of Russia since 1991.

<div style="overflow-x:scroll; width:100%; ">

Notes

References

External links
Rulers.org
  Иванов В. В. Глава субъекта Российской Федерации. История губернаторов. Том I. История. Книга I. — М., 2019. — 600 с.
  Иванов В. В. Глава субъекта Российской Федерации. История губернаторов. Том I. История. Книга II. — М., 2019. — 624 с.

 
Federal subjects
Russia